The men's pole vault event  at the 1993 IAAF World Indoor Championships was held on 12 and 13 March.

Medalists

Results

Qualification
Qualification: 5.60 (Q) or at least 12 best performers (q) qualified for the final.

Final

References

Pole
Pole vault at the World Athletics Indoor Championships